Spindler or Špindler (English, German and Jewish (Ashkenazic): occupational name for a spindle maker) is a surname. Notable people with the surname include:

 Amy Spindler (1963–2004), American journalist
 Angela Spindler, British businesswoman, CEO of The Original Factory Shop
 Betty Spindler (born 1943), American ceramist
 Charles Spindler (1865–1938), Alsatian painter, marquetry inlayer, writer and photographer
 Fritz Spindler (1817–1905), German pianist and composer
 George Spindler, American anthropologist
 Herbert Spindler (born 1954), Austrian former cyclist
 James C. Spindler, American lawyer and law professor
 Jaroslav Špindler (1890–1965), Bohemian-Austrian footballer
 Johanne Spindler (1781–1861), Danish ballet dancer and stage actress
 Karl Spindler (naval officer) (1887–1951), German naval officer who was involved in an attempt to bring German arms ashore in Ireland in 1916
 Karl Spindler (novelist) (1796–1855), German novelist
 Konrad Spindler, Austrian archaeologist
 Ludwig Spindler, German World War II Waffen-SS officer
 Marc Spindler (born 1969), American retired National Football League player
 Michael Spindler (1942–2017), German manager and former CEO of Apple Computer, Inc.
 Nellie Spindler (1891–1917), British nurse killed during the First World War Battle of Passchendaele
 Sid Spindler (1932–2008), Australian politician
 Sybille Spindler, East German former slalom canoeist who competed in the 1970s
 William Spindler (born 1963), Guatemalan writer and journalist

See also
 Špindlerův Mlýn, town in the Czech Republic

Occupational surnames
German-language surnames
Jewish surnames
English-language occupational surnames